James Ross (15 February 1880 – 31 October 1914), was a Scottish rugby union player for . He was one of the first Scottish rugby internationalists to die in the First World War, and fell at Messines.

He was capped for  five times between 1901 and 1903. He also played for London Scottish FC, which he had captained in 1901-02 and 1904–05. His brother Edward Ross, also gained a single cap in 1904.

Early life

Rugby career

International appearances

Military service

See also
 List of international rugby union players killed in action during the First World War

References

Bibliography

External links
 Commonwealth War Graves database

1880 births
1914 deaths
People educated at Cargilfield School
People educated at Fettes College
London Scottish F.C. players
Scottish rugby union players
Scotland international rugby union players
British military personnel killed in World War I
London Regiment soldiers
British Army personnel of World War I